Cole Plante is an American DJ/Producer from Los Angeles, California. He is currently signed to Hollywood Records and has contributed music to Disney movies and TV shows. Plante has played at Rain Nightclub in Las Vegas, Nevada and the Avalon Nightclub in Hollywood. Cole has shared the stage with DJs Paul Oakenfold and Avicii. He also performed at Lollapalooza 2013 alongside Skrillex and Steve Angello. He has also joined Demi Lovato on the "Neon Lights Tour" in 2014. Cole is currently the house DJ for the Teen Wolf recap talkshow "Wolf Watch" on MTV.

Biography 
Cole was born on November 8, 1996, to Josef and Vanessa Plante as Matthew Cole Plante, and has an older brother named Ethan. Cole began DJing when he was around 10 to 12 years old. While his family was moving between homes, Cole found Pioneer CDJs and a mixer among the boxes. He started tooling and playing with them. Eventually, he started making real music and began playing at clubs. He attended Beverly Hills High School in Beverly Hills, CA, graduating in 2015. In high school, he would perform at Homecoming and other events.

Plante made a guest appearance as himself in an episode of the Disney XD series Max Steel. He is also composer of the series.

Discography

Singles

EPs

References

External links
 
 

Living people
American DJs
Hollywood Records artists
1996 births